Malayil Abraham Oommen (born 24 February 1932) is an economist and academic from Kerala, India. He wrote several books and published many articles on issues such as democracy, development, decentralization and economy of Kerala and India. He worked as economic adviser to the Botswana government.

Biography
M. A. Oommen was born on 24 February 1932 at Venmony in present-day Alappuzha district. His father M. O. Abraham was a school teacher. In his autobiography Ormmappadikal, he mentions that, after his own father, it was M. M. Thomas who shaped his outlook on life. Theologian M. M. Thomas introduced Marxism and other ideologies in his youth classes in Thiruvananthapuram.

Born into a conservative Christian family, Oommen is popularly referred as a "Christian socialist". Although Oommen had a Marxist leaning, Congress leaders also benefited significantly from his insights.

Oommen done his college education at University College Thiruvananthapuram with economics as his area of specialization. After completing his master's degree in Economics with First Rank from Kerala University in 1954, he done his Ph.D. from Kerala University in 1968. He also studied Diploma in Economic Development, from Institute for the Study of Economic Development at Naples, Italy.

Oommen developed an accurate and scientific curriculum for the departments of economics in various universities of Kerala and also conducted financial planning for African countries such as Botswana. He has worked at the Institute for the Study of Economic Development in Naples, Italy, and at the Center for Economic Growth at Yale University. He is also an Honorary Professor, Centre for Development Studies, Thiruvananthapuram. He was the first teacher of the economics department at University of Kerala, was the first economics professor at University of Calicut and was the founder-director of John Matthai Centre at Thrissur, Kerala.

Oommen, who has been appointed economic adviser to the Botswana government, has publicly criticized the country's central budget for generously subsidizing rich businessmen. Following this, his tenure was cut short by the Botswana government and he returned Kerala. Oommen also held several positions including chairman of Institute for Sustainable Development and Governance, Chairman of the 4th State Finance Commission, Government of Kerala and patron of Kerala Economic Asosiation.

Writing career
Oommen became well known in the academic community for his comprehensive writing on key issues such as democracy, development and decentralization. He wrote more than 30 books in Malayalam and English and published 400 papers which collectively form a comprehensive economic history of Kerala's last 7 decades.

Former Kerala finance minister T. M. Thomas Isaac said that Oommen was one of the pioneers who wrote extensively on the role of land reform in Kerala enhancing the capacity of the people of Kerala and in removing the barriers to it. While he is proud of the changes that land reform has brought to Kerala, he is also one of the first scholars to point out its limitations, added Isaac.

Oommen's 2008 study on the role of the Kutumbashree movement in uplifting the social status of women in Kerala is important in this regard. This report has been prepared by studying 7000 Kudumbahsree member families.

Works

Books
Essay on Physical Decentralization to Local Governments.
Democracy, Development and Decentralisation, collection of essays.
 An Introductory Study on the Human Developmental Science of Amartya Sen.

Autobiography

Awards and honours
He is the first honorary distinguished fellow of Gulati Institute of Finance and Taxation.
Honorary fellow of Centre for Development Studies, Government of Kerala.
Rockefeller Foundation Post-Doctoral Award 1968
Senior Fulbright Scholarship (1974–75)

Works on him
 Festschrift of contributed articles for M.A. Oommen.

References

1932 births
Living people
20th-century Indian economists
People from Alappuzha district
Indian Marxists
Indian socialists
Yale University faculty
University of Kerala alumni
University College Thiruvananthapuram alumni
Academic staff of the University of Kerala
Academic staff of the University of Calicut